The UK Albums Chart is one of many music charts compiled by the Official Charts Company that calculates the best-selling albums of the week in the United Kingdom. Before 2004, the chart was only based on the sales of physical albums. This list shows albums that peaked in the Top 10 of the UK Albums Chart during 1968, as well as albums which peaked in 1967 and 1969 but were in the top 10 in 1968. The entry date is when the album appeared in the top ten for the first time (week ending, as published by the Official Charts Company, which is six days after the chart is announced).

The first new number-one album of the year was by Val Doonican Rocks, But Gently by Val Doonican. Overall, twelve different albums peaked at number one in 1968, with twelve unique artists hitting that position.

Top-ten albums
Key

Notes

 Otis Blue/Otis Redding Sings Soul originally peaked at number 6 upon its release in 1966. It re-entered the top 10 at number 9 on 9 March 1968 (week ending) for three weeks. It re-entered the top 10 again at number 9 on 6 April 1968 (week ending) for one week.
 Buddy Holly's Greatest Hits originally peaked at number 10 upon its release in 1967. It re-entered the top 10 at a brand new peak of number 9 on 9 March 1968 (week ending) for one week.

See also
1968 in British music
List of number-one albums from the 1960s (UK)

References
General

Specific

External links
1968 album chart archive at the Official Charts Company (click on relevant week)

United Kingdom top 10 albums
Top 10 albums
1968